Pestalotiopsis mangiferae is a fungal plant pathogen infecting mangoes.

References

External links
 USDA ARS Fungal Database

Fungal plant pathogens and diseases
Mango tree diseases
mangiferae